Joseph Rowley (13 October 1899 – 1982) was an English footballer who played in the Football League for Bristol Rovers and Coventry City.

References

1899 births
1982 deaths
English footballers
Association football midfielders
English Football League players
Coventry City F.C. players
Bristol Rovers F.C. players
Oakengates Athletic F.C. players
Oswestry Town F.C. players